Northwest is a compass point.

Northwest or north-west or north west may also refer to:

 Northwest (direction), an intercardinal direction

Geography

Africa 
 North West (Nigeria)
 North West Tunisia
 North-West District (Botswana)
 Northwest Region (Cameroon)
 North West (South African province)

Asia and Oceania 
 North West Australia, an unofficial geographical region
 North West Delhi, India
 Northwest Province (IMCRA region), an Australian marine biogeographic province
 North West District, Singapore
 North-West Frontier Province, former name of the Pakistani province Khyber Pakhtunkhwa
 Tay Bac, literally Northwest Vietnam

Europe 
 North West England, region
 Northern and Western Region, region in the Republic of Ireland
 North-West (European Parliament constituency), in the Republic of Ireland (2004 to 2014)
 Copenhagen North West, Denmark
 Northwestern Krai or Northwestern Land in the historical Russian Empire

Americas 
 Northwestern United States
 Pacific Northwest, unofficial region in the United States and Canada
 Northwest Territories, federal territory of Canada
 Northwest Territories (electoral district), Canadian federal electoral district
 North-Western Territory, former territory in British North America administered by the Hudson's Bay Company
 Northwest Passage, sea route traversing Canada's Arctic archipelago
 Northwest Territory, former incorporated territory of the United States in the Great Lakes region
 Northwest, Washington, D.C., in the United States
 Northwest District, Portland, Oregon in the United States
 Argentine Northwest

Schools 
 Northwest High School (disambiguation), several high schools
 Northwest School, Seattle, Washington
 Northwest University (disambiguation), several schools

Other uses
Northwest Ordinance, U.S. ordinance outlining the provisions of accepting a new state
Northwest Smith, a character in science fiction stories by C. L. Moore
Northwest Airlines, a former major airline purchased by Delta Air Lines that ceased operating in 2009
North by Northwest, a 1959 American thriller film directed by Alfred Hitchcock 
North West, eldest daughter of Kanye West and Kim Kardashian 
 North West (HBC vessel), operated by the HBC from 1882-1897, see Hudson's Bay Company vessels
 Hastings West-Northwest Journal of Environmental Law and Policy, a journal of environmental law and policy that was founded in 1994

See also

 Norwest (disambiguation)
 Northwestern (disambiguation)
 Northwestern Province (disambiguation)
 Northwest Passage (disambiguation)
 Nord-Ouest (disambiguation)
 Nord-Vest (development region), a region in Romania
 
 
 

Orientation (geometry)